Sally Reid (born in Perth, Scotland) is a Scottish stage, radio and television actress who trained at Langside College, Glasgow and with the Steppenwolf Theatre Company and the Second City Training Center in Chicago.

Appearances

Theatre

Radio

Television

2019- River City Claire baldy

References

External links
 Interview: Kenny Miller director of Days Of Wine And Roses. The Scotsman, 9 October 2011.

Year of birth missing (living people)
Living people
People from Perth, Scotland
People educated at Perth High School
Scottish radio actresses
Scottish stage actresses
Scottish television actresses